Weston is an unincorporated community located in the town of Weston, Dunn County, Wisconsin, United States.

Weston was named for an early settler.

Notes

Unincorporated communities in Dunn County, Wisconsin
Unincorporated communities in Wisconsin